Mincy is an unincorporated community in south-central Taney County, in the Ozarks of southern Missouri, United States. Mincy is located approximately four miles north of the Missouri-Arkansas border and near the upper end of Bull Shoals Lake of the White River. Mincy is the namesake for the Drury-Mincy Conservation Area to the south and east.

History
A post office called Mincy was established in 1870, and remained in operation until 1955. The community has the name of the local Mincy family.

References

Unincorporated communities in Taney County, Missouri
Unincorporated communities in Missouri